American singer Mavis Staples was born in Chicago, Illinois on July 10, 1939. Her initial recordings were as a member of her family group, the Staple Singers. Led by her father Roebuck "Pops" Staples the Staple Singers were major artists in gospel and soul music from 1957 to 1969. Commencing releasing albums as a solo artist in 1969, Mavis Staples has released 13 studio albums, two live albums, three compilations, one soundtrack, one EP, and 51 singles over a career spanning five decades.

Albums

Studio albums

Live albums

Soundtrack albums

Compilation albums

Tribute albums

Extended plays

Singles

As lead artist

As featured artist

Other charted songs

Other appearances

Music videos

Notes

References

Staples, Mavis